Nikkei CNBC (日経CNBC) is a business and financial news television channel broadcast in Japan. It is owned primarily by CNBC Asia and Japanese media group Nikkei, Inc. and its subsidiary, TV Tokyo Holdings Corporation.

The channel is a result of the merger of the former Nikkei Satellite News (launched 1990) and Asia Business News (launched 1997, renamed CNBC Business News in 1998) by an agreement with CNBC Asia and Nihon Keizai Shimbun.

Programming

Current schedule 
Red means "Nikkei CNBC produced", green means "other channels produced" and blue means "CNBC produced".

Former shows 
 Tokyo Squawk Box (TOKYOスクワークボックス)
 Tokyo Power Lunch (TOKYOパワーランチ)
 Tokyo Update (TOKYOアップデート)
 Tokyo Market Wrap (TOKYOマーケットラップ)
 Weekly Wrap (ウィークリーラップ)
 Business Today (ビジネスTODAY)
 Tokyo Morning Express (TOKYOモーニングExpress)
 Tokyo Market Express (TOKYOマーケットラExpress)
 Nikkei CNBC Express (日経CNBC Express)
 Tokyo Market Watch (TOKYOマーケットウォッチ)
 China Market Flash (中国株式Flash)
 Asia Express (ASIAエクスプレス)
 News Zone
 News Core
 NIKKEI Japan Report

Taglines 
 "Profit From It" (1998–2002)
 "Make It Your Business" (2002–2004)
 "The World Leader in Business News" (2004 - 2006-06-11)
 "First in Business Worldwide" (2006-06-12 - present)

See also 
CNBC

External links 
 Nikkei CNBC Official site 
 Nikkei CNBC Live

 
CNBC global channels
Television channels and stations established in 1999
1999 establishments in Japan